Soner Örnek (born 28 February 1989) is a Turkish footballer.

External links
 
 Guardian Stats Centre

1989 births
People from Şahinbey
Living people
Turkish footballers
Turkey youth international footballers
Association football defenders
Gaziantepspor footballers
Şanlıurfaspor footballers
Eyüpspor footballers
Tokatspor footballers
Gaziantep F.K. footballers
Hatayspor footballers
Süper Lig players
TFF First League players
TFF Second League players
TFF Third League players